For people with similar names, see: Alberto Chiesa - Italian rugby union player, Carlo Alberto Chiesa - Italian screenwriter and Carlo Alberto Dalla Chiesa - Italian general  

Alberto Henri Chiesa is a former male Swiss tennis player. He competed at the 1920 Summer Olympics and participated in the Men's singles tennis event.

References

External links
 
 

Olympic tennis players of Switzerland
Swiss male tennis players
Tennis players at the 1920 Summer Olympics
Year of birth missing
Year of death missing